A braille embosser is an impact printer that renders text as tactile braille cells. Using braille translation software, a document or digital text can be embossed with relative ease. This makes braille production efficient and cost-effective. Braille translation software may be free and open-sourced or paid.

Blind users tend to call other printers "ink printers," to distinguish them from their braille counterparts. This is often the case regardless of the type of printer being discussed (e.g., thermal printers being called "ink printers" even though they use no ink).

As with ink printers and presses, embossers range from those intended for consumers to those used by large publishers. The price of embossers increase with the volume of braille it produces .

Types 
The fastest industrial braille embosser is probably the $92,000 Belgian-made NV Interpoint 55, first produced in 1991, which uses a separate air compressor to drive the embossing head and can output up to 800 braille characters per second. Adoption was slow at first; in 2000 the National Federation of the Blind said there were only three of these in the US, one owned by the NFB itself and the other two by the Watchtower Bible and Tract Society. As of 2008, there are more than 60 in use across the world.

Smaller desktop braille embossers are more common and can be found in libraries, universities, and specialist education centers, as well as being privately owned by blind individuals. It may be necessary to use an acoustic cabinet or hood to dampen the noise level.

Braille embossers usually need special braille paper which is thicker and more expensive than normal paper. Some high-end embossers are capable of printing on normal paper. Embossers can be either one-sided or two-sided. Two-sided embossing requires lining up the dots so they do not overlap (called "interpoint" because the points on the other side are placed in between the points on the first side). Two-sided embossing uses less paper and reduces the size of the output.

Once one copy of a document has been produced, printing further copies is often quicker by means of a device called a thermoform, which produces copies on soft plastic. However, the resulting braille is not as easily readable as braille that has been freshly embossed, in much the same way that a poor-quality photocopy is not as readable as the original. Hence large publishers do not generally use thermoforms.

Some embossers can produce "dotty Moon", i.e., Moon type shapes formed by dots.

See also 
 Braigo
 Mountbatten Brailler
 Book
 E-book
 Braille e-book
 Braille translator

References 

Braille technology